The Volvo XC60 is a compact luxury crossover SUV manufactured and marketed by Swedish automaker Volvo Cars since 2008.

The XC60 is part of Volvo's 60 Series of automobiles, along with the S60, S60 Cross Country, V60, and V60 Cross Country. The first generation model introduced a new style for the 60 Series models. Along with the rest of the line-up, the first-generation XC60 was refreshed in 2013. Similarly, the second-generation model, released in 2017, is the first in the series. The car was named Car of the Year Japan for 2017–2018.

XC60 concept (2007)
The XC60 concept was unveiled at the 2007 Detroit Auto Show. It included a glass roof and a newly styled grille. The model introduced Volvo's new styling cues, which were gradually implemented throughout the model range. The XC60 concept also included a new shifting mechanism, electronic bootlid, and 20-inch wheels.

First generation (2008–2016)

The production vehicle was unveiled at the 2008 Geneva Motor Show. Sales began in Europe in the third quarter of 2008 and in North America in early 2009 as a 2010 model. The XC60 has been Volvo's best selling car since 2009.

Manufactured by subsidiary Volvo Car Gent in Ghent, Belgium, the first generation XC60 is based on Volvo's P3 platform and the XC60 shares technology with the Land Rover Freelander of 2007. At the time of development, both Land Rover and Volvo were owned by Ford and development was split between the two subsidiaries. Much of the engineering and tuning of this CUV was done by Volvo in Sweden, although offroad capabilities were developed at Land Rover in England.

In April 2010, an R-Design variant of the XC60 became available, featuring a colour-matching body kit, stiffer chassis and damping, and other unique exterior/interior trim.

In February 2013, Volvo debuted a refreshed version of the XC60, to be released for the 2014 model year. Exterior updates are primarily cosmetic, with changes to the grille and front driving lights, loss of black cladding along the lower doorsills, and minor changes to the exhaust tips and taillights. Interior updates include new materials and dashboard trims, available paddle shifter on the T6 model, and introduction of a 7" touch-screen display.

XC60 Ocean Race

In 2014, special blue colour.

XC60 Plug-in Hybrid Concept

The Volvo XC60 plug-in hybrid concept was unveiled at the 2012 North American International Auto Show. Recharging time is 3.5 hours from a 220 V outlet and 7.5 hours from a 110 V outlet. The model was never released for production.

Engines

Safety
The XC60 includes traditional Volvo safety features including a whiplash protection system, side impact protection system, roll stability control, dynamic stability and traction control, inflatable curtain airbags, hill descent control (AWD only), collision warning with brake support, active bi-xenon lights (optional on some models), and patented front, side, and rear structures. The XC60 also introduced a new technology feature that Volvo has named City safety. The system is described as a driver support system with the goal of preventing or mitigating vehicle-on-vehicle collisions below ; it does so through the use of a closing velocity sensor that helps determine whether a collision is likely. Depending on the speed, if a collision is likely, the Volvo's computer system will either prepare the car to brake or automatically brake the vehicle to avoid or mitigate a rear-end collision.

In 2011, the Highway Loss Data Institute credited City Safety for 27% fewer property damage liability claims, 51% fewer bodily injury liability claims, and 22% fewer collision claims for the XC60 compared to other midsize luxury SUVs. The XC60 had fewer insurance claims compared to other Volvo models lacking the City Safety feature.

Euro NCAP evaluated the XC60 in 2008, awarding it 5 of 5 stars for adult occupant protection. The XC60 scored 16 of 16 points in the front test and 16 of 16 in the side test. The car received 2 of 2 points available in the pole test and an additional 3 points available for seat belt reminders. The XC60 received a total of 37 of 37 points and therefore five stars (33–37) in Euro NCAP's evaluation. The XC60 was one of only three cars to receive 37 of 37 available points under Euro NCAP's point based evaluation at the time.

The Insurance Institute for Highway Safety awarded the Volvo XC60 their Top Safety Pick+ award. The XC60 was granted the IIHS's highest rating of "good" in front, side, rear and roof strength tests and has Electronic Stability Control as standard equipment to receive the award.

Euro NCAP

Insurance Institute for Highway Safety (IIHS)

1 vehicle structure rated "Good"
2 strength-to-weight ratio: 5.23

NHTSA

Marketing
Volvo used the 2009 film The Twilight Saga: New Moon to promote the XC60, including an online contest to give away models identical to the one driven by lead character Edward Cullen.

Second generation (2017–present)

The second generation XC60 was unveiled at the 2017 Geneva Motor Show. The first −60 series model in its generation and the first since Volvo's purchase by Geely, it is based on the same Scalable Product Architecture (SPA) platform as the S90, V90, and XC90. As part of Volvo's move toward smaller engines, the new model uses only four-cylinder engines, in various configurations and states of tune, again shared with the −90 series models.

The car was facelifted on 2 March 2021, with the new version debuting alongside the Volvo C40. The engines remain the same 2.0 litre with petrol, diesel, or PHEV power. Like the XC40 Recharge Electric and the C40, the XC60 facelift also gains a new Android-powered infotainment system that's been developed in collaboration with Google.

Plug-in hybrid 
The XC60 was released with a T8 plug-in hybrid variant that used the T6 engine combined with a 10.4 kWh battery (9.2 kWh usable) and an  rear electric motor to produce . For the 2021 model year, T8 models were renamed to "Recharge" models. 

For the 2022 model year, Volvo released an XC60 Recharge Extended Range.

Markets

Asia Markets
Volvo's sold in Indonesia, the Philippines, Taiwan, Thailand, and Vietnam are all imported from Malaysia's Volvo factory in Shah Alam.

Trim levels
The XC60 is available in Core, Plus, and Ultimate as of 2023 name changes.

Engines

Sales
The Volvo XC60 has been Volvo's best selling car, with sales increasing every year since its release in 2008. The second generation XC60 (released in 2017) has continued to set new sales records.

Notes

References

External links

  (International)

XC60
Cars introduced in 2008
2010s cars
2020s cars
Compact sport utility vehicles
Luxury crossover sport utility vehicles
Front-wheel-drive vehicles
All-wheel-drive vehicles
Hybrid sport utility vehicles
Partial zero-emissions vehicles
Plug-in hybrid vehicles
Euro NCAP small off-road
Euro NCAP large off-road